Rustem is a masculine given name derived from the name, Rostam, the name of the Persian epic figure Rostam. It is spelled Рустем in Russian, Ukrainian, Kazakh, Tatar, Bosnian, Albanian, and some other languages.

Given name 
 Rustem Adagamov, Russian blogger
 Rustem Akhmetzyanov, Russian footballer
 Rustem Bulatov, Russian footballer
 Rustem Hayroudinoff, Russian concert pianist
 Rustem Kanipov, Russian footballer
 Rustem Mukhametshin (born 1984), Russian footballer
 Rustam Temirgaliev (born 1976), Russian and Ukrainian politician of Volga Tatar descent
 Rustem Vambery, Hungarian politician

Surname 
 Jan Rustem (1762–1835), Lithuanian painter

See also 
 Rüstem, the Turkish form of the name
 Rostam (name)

Turkic masculine given names